A palisade is a steel or wooden fence or wall of variable height, usually used as a defensive structure.

Palisade, palisades or palisading also may refer to:

Software
 PALISADE (software), an open source cross platform software library that provides implementations of lattice-based cryptography building blocks and homomorphic encryption schemes

Geology
 Columnar basalt, a common extrusive igneous (volcanic) rock formed from the rapid cooling of basaltic lava exposed at or very near the surface of a planet
 List of places with columnar jointed volcanics

United States
 The Palisades (Hudson River), cliffs along the Hudson River in the US states of New York and New Jersey
 Palisades Sill, an intrusive igneous body that forms the cliffs largely following the southern portion of the Hudson River
 Palisades (California Sierra), a group of peaks in the Sierra Nevada range of east-central California
 Palisade Glacier, California
 The Palisades (Napa County), a mountain range in the northern San Francisco Bay Area, California
 The Palisade (Colorado), a butte in Mesa County, Colorado
 Palisade Head, a headland on the North Shore of Lake Superior in Minnesota
 Mississippi Palisades State Park, encompassing cliffs along the Mississippi River in northwestern Illinois
 Kentucky River Palisades, cliffs along the Kentucky River in central Kentucky

Canada
 Jasper Palisade, a mountain formation in Jasper National Park, Alberta

Communities
Canada
 Palisade, Saskatchewan
 The Palisades, Edmonton

United States
 Pacific Palisades, Los Angeles, California
 Palisade, Colorado
 Palisade, Minnesota
 Palisade, Nebraska
 Palisade, Nevada
 Palisades, New York
 Palisades Park, New Jersey
 The Palisades, Washington, D.C., a neighborhood

Biology
 Palisade cell, a type of cell found in plant leaves
 Palisade (pathology), a single layer of relatively long cells

Places
Palisades Amusement Park, former amusement park in Bergen County, New Jersey
Palisades Park (Freddy Cannon song), a hit song by Freddy Cannon
Palisades Park (Counting Crows song), a song by Counting Crows
 Palisade Avenue (Hudson Palisades) in Hudson and Bergen, New Jersey
 Palisades Center, a major shopping center in West Nyack, New York
 Palisades Charter High School, in Los Angeles, California
 Palisades Dam, Idaho
 Palisades Interstate Parkway, a highway in New York and New Jersey
Palisades (music venue), a former live music venue in Bushwick, Brooklyn
 Palisades Nuclear Generating Station, in Van Buren County, Michigan
 Palisades School District, in northeastern Bucks County, Pennsylvania
 Palisades Tahoe, a ski resort in Olympic Valley, California
 Palisades Toys, a company that produced action figures and other collectibles

Music
 Palisades (band), an American post-hardcore/hardcore band from Iselin, New Jersey
 "Palisades", a song by Puressence from the album Don't Forget to Remember
 "Palisades", a song by Angels of Light from the album Everything Is Good Here / Please Come Home
 "The Palisades", a song by Childish Gambino on his STN MTN / Kauai EP

Vehicles
 Hyundai Palisade, a 2018–present South Korean mid-size SUV